Kallum Xzeiba Tracey Cesay (born 4 September 2002) is a professional footballer who plays as a right-back or midfielder for Premier League club Tottenham Hotspur. Born in England, he plays for the Sierra Leone national team.

International career
In March 2022, Cesay received his first call-up to Sierra Leone national team for friendly matches against Togo, Liberia and Congo. He made his international debut on 29 March 2022 and scored a brace in his team's 2–1 win against Congo.

Career statistics

International

Scores and results list Sierra Leone's goal tally first, score column indicates score after each Cesay goal.

References

External links
 

2002 births
Living people
Association football defenders
Association football midfielders
English footballers
Sierra Leonean footballers
Sierra Leone international footballers
Black British sportspeople
English sportspeople of Sierra Leonean descent